Ng Wui (December 3, 1913 - March 1, 1996) was a Hong Kong film director, writer and actor, best known for his films of the 1950s and 1960s.He is credited with over 200 films under his direction.

Filmography

Films 
 1952 The Prodigal Son - Director
 1954 Madam Yun (aka Madam Wan, Six Chapters of a Floating Life) -  Director.
 1957 The Thunderstorm - Director
 1959 Daughter of a Grand Household (aka The Missing Cinderella) - Yu's boss. Also Director.
 1959 The Road (aka One Mind, One Heart, Road) - Head of Japanese troops. Also as Director, screenwriter.
 1967 The Divorce Brinkmanship - Director 
 1967 Miss. Mr. Mrs. - Screenwriter, director.
 1967 They Fought Shoulder to Shoulder - Also as director.
 1977 No Money No Talk - Director.

As actor
 Xuelei Qinghua (1939)
 Nanguo zimei hua (1939) - Siu Dip's father
 Gumu Yuanhun (1939)
 Heiye Shaxing (1939)
 Baoqing Lane (1939)
 Zhanlong Yuxian Ji (1940)
 Zhao Zilong (1940)
 Renhai Leihen (1940)
 Hua jie shen nu (1941)
 Ruan shi san xiong (1941)
 Roar of the People (1941)
 Minzu de Housheng (1941)
 Liuwang Zhi Ge (1941)
 Ye Shang Hai (1941)
 Fenghuo Guxiang (1941)
 Xuegong Chunse (1941)
 Tianshang Renjian (1941)
 Kuangfeng Yuhou Hua (1947)
 Huo shao lian huan chuan (1951)
 Leng yue ban lang gui (1952)
 Ri chu (1953) - Huang Shengsan
 Chun (1953) - Cheng Kwok-gwong
 Yun niang (1954)
 Ping ji (1954) - Yee Suk
 Liang di xiang si (1955)
 Kong que dong nan fei (1956)
 Gou hun shi zhe (1956)
 Qi chong tian (1956) - Mouse
 The Thunderstorm (1957) - Lu Kuei
 Shui hu zhuan: Zhi qu sheng chen gang (1957)
 Feng huo jia ren (1958)
 Da dong gua (1958)
 A Chao jie hun (1958)
 Lu (1959)
 Du zhang fu (1959) - Chief Inspector
 Qi xiao fu (1961)
 Bu bu zhui zong (1962)
 Nan de you qing lang (1962) - Kei
 Niu ji xin niang (1962)
 Chun dao ren jian (1963) - Ying's father
 Guai xia yan zi fei (1963)
 Bo ming hong yan (1963)
 Zuo ye meng hun zhong (1963) - Sheng
 Xiang cheng yan shi (1964)
 Nan hun nu jia (1964)
 Yi chan yi bai wan (1966)
 Bian cheng san xia (1966)
 Fei zei bai ju hua (1969)
 Jia yi (1970)
 Mi ren de ai qing (1970)
 Heung gong chat sup sam (1974)
 Sing gei cha low (1974)
 Gou yao gou gu (1978)
 Shi ba (1980) - Uncle Ching
 Lao chen dang wang (1981)
 Hua sha (1982)
 Gu shou (1983)
 Hui mie hao di che (1983)
 The Home at Hong Kong (1983)
 Ai nu xin zhuan (1984)
 Lo foo chut gaam (1989)
 Tin joek yau ching (1990)
 Ge ge de qing ren (1992)
 A Moment of Romance II (1993) - Butler
 The Bare-Footed Kid (1993)
 Hail the Judge (1994) - Lung-Sing's Dad (final film role)

References

External links

 Ng Wui at filmaffinity.com
 Ng Wui at senscritique.com

Hong Kong film directors
1913 births
1996 deaths
Hong Kong male film actors
20th-century Hong Kong male actors
Chinese emigrants to British Hong Kong